Scott Allen Rislov (born June 26, 1980) is an American football quarterback most recently playing in the Arena Football League for the San Jose SaberCats in 2008.

Early life
Rislov was born in Pierre, South Dakota to Greg and Diane Rislov and is of Norwegian descent.  He graduated from T. F. Riggs High School in Pierre in 1999. As a quarterback at Riggs, Rislov was twice an all-league selection and in his senior year (1998) an honorable mention All-America pick by USA Today. In addition to football, Rislov played basketball at Riggs.

College career
After redshirting his freshman year, Rislov played six games in 2000 with the University of North Dakota Fighting Sioux football team. In 2001, Rislov transferred to Ellsworth Community College in Iowa. He was named Honorable Mention All-American by the NJCAA that year. From 2002 to 2003, Rislov was the starting quarterback for the San Jose State Spartans. In 2004, Rislov graduated from San Jose State University with a Bachelor of Science degree in psychology.

Professional career
Rislov tried out with the Cincinnati Bengals but never played, before moving on to the Sioux Falls Storm, Nashville Kats, Central Valley Coyotes, and the San Jose Sabercats. While playing for the af2 Coyotes in 2006, he threw a league-record 106 touchdown passes.

After football
Rislov worked as a sales representative with Realm Communications Group from 2007 to 2009, then with that company as an account manager and sales manager.  In August 2011, Rislov earned his Master's in Business Administration from San Jose State.

He has worked at Bay Area Security Firm, Proofpoint, where he has worked with the firm's largest Higher Education Institutions.

References

External links
 arenafan.com profile

1980 births
Living people
American football quarterbacks
Ellsworth Panthers football players
Central Valley Coyotes players
Nashville Kats players
San Jose SaberCats players
San Jose State Spartans football players
Sioux Falls Storm players
North Dakota Fighting Hawks football players
People from Pierre, South Dakota
Players of American football from South Dakota
American people of Norwegian descent